The 1936 NC State Wolfpack football team was an American football team that represented North Carolina State University as a member of the Southern Conference (SoCon) during the 1936 college football season. In its third and final season under head coach Hunk Anderson, the team compiled a 5–3–1 record (4–2–1 against SoCon opponents) and was outscored by a total of 84 to 79.

Schedule

References

NC State
NC State Wolfpack football seasons
NC State Wolfpack football